Matteo Guerinoni is an Italian-Indonesian former racer and restaurant owner. In 2015, he became a judge on MasterChef Indonesia on RCTI. He was formerly a commentator on MotoGP on Trans7 and Fox Sports Asia.

References 

Living people
Italian emigrants to Indonesia
Naturalised citizens of Indonesia
1968 births